Thomas Henry "Harry" Kinsell (3 May 1921 – 14 August 2000) was an English footballer who played as a full back for West Bromwich Albion, Bolton Wanderers, Reading, West Ham United and Bedford Town.

Playing career
Kinsell was born in Cannock, Staffordshire. He began playing football at local and regional schoolboy level in Staffordshire in the early 1930s. West Bromwich Albion signed him as a 14-year-old on an amateur basis on 31 May 1935. Still aged 14 he made his debut, on loan, for Hednesford Town at the end of the 1935–36 season in a 3–1 defeat away at Stourbridge. He continued to play in the youth teams for West Bromwich Albion for the next two seasons before signing a professional contract on 1 June 1938.

War-time football
On 3 September 1939, the outbreak of the Second World War cut-short Kinsell's professional career. During the war Kinsell played as a guest player for Mansfield, Middlesbrough, Southend United and Grimsby Town. He also played for Blackpool against Aston Villa in the 1944 League North Cup Final where they lost 4–5 on aggregate. Kinsell also gained international honours with England in two victory games against Northern Ireland in September and Wales in October 1945 as well as playing for the FA Services XI against Switzerland, the Army, Combined Services and Western Command, making a total of 67 wartime appearances.

After World War Two
Kinsell had to wait until the end of World War II to make his Albion debut. He started in the FA Cup for West Brom on 5 January 1946 against Cardiff City and made his league debut in a 3–2 defeat away at Swansea Town on 31 August 1946. Kinsell was a member of the 1948–49 Second Division promotion-winning side. He made 158 appearances for West Bromwich Albion before being sold to Bolton Wanderers on 1 June 1949, for what was then a club record transfer fee of £12,000. He moved to Reading on 1 May 1950 and to West Ham United on 1 January 1951, for a fee of £5,250 making his debut on 13 January 1951 in a 3–2 home defeat to Blackburn Rovers. He scored his only two career goals for West Ham against Birmingham City and Everton, in 101 appearances over five seasons. In May 1956, Kinsell moved to Bedford Town.

After football
After retirement from football Kinsell ran the Alma Arms pub in Stratford, London before returning to live in Brierley Hill until his death in Dudley, West Midlands on 14 August 2000.

References

1921 births
2000 deaths
People from Cannock
English footballers
Southern Football League players
English Football League players
Bolton Wanderers F.C. players
West Bromwich Albion F.C. players
West Ham United F.C. players
Reading F.C. players
Bedford Town F.C. players
Middlesbrough F.C. wartime guest players
Mansfield Town F.C. wartime guest players
Grimsby Town F.C. wartime guest players
Blackpool F.C. wartime guest players
England wartime international footballers
Association football defenders